

Events

Pre-1600
1118 – The city of Zaragoza is conquered by king Alfonso I of Aragon from the Almoravid. 
1271 – Kublai Khan renames his empire "Yuan" (元 yuán), officially marking the start of the Yuan dynasty of Mongolia and China.
1499 – A rebellion breaks out in Alpujarras in response to the forced conversions of Muslims in Spain.

1601–1900
1622 – Portuguese forces score a military victory over the Kingdom of Kongo at the Battle of Mbumbi in present-day Angola.
1655 – The Whitehall Conference ends with the determination that there was no law preventing Jews from re-entering England after the Edict of Expulsion of 1290.
1777 – The United States celebrates its first Thanksgiving, marking the recent victory by the American rebels over British General John Burgoyne at Saratoga in October.
1787 – New Jersey becomes the third state to ratify the U.S. Constitution.
1793 – Surrender of the frigate La Lutine by French Royalists to Lord Samuel Hood; renamed , she later becomes a famous treasure wreck.
1833 – The national anthem of the Russian Empire, "God Save the Tsar!", is first performed.
1854 – The Legislative Assembly of the Province of Canada abolishes the seigneurial system.
1865 – US Secretary of State William Seward proclaims the adoption of the Thirteenth Amendment, prohibiting slavery throughout the United States. 
1867 – A magnitude 7.0 earthquakes strikes off the coast of Taiwan, triggering a tsunami and killing at least 580 people.
1878 – The Al-Thani family become the rulers of the state of Qatar.
1892 – Premiere performance of The Nutcracker by Pyotr Ilyich Tchaikovsky in Saint Petersburg, Russia.

1901–present
1916 – World War I: The Battle of Verdun ends when the second French offensive pushes the Germans back two or three kilometres, causing them to cease their attacks.
1917 – The resolution containing the language of the Eighteenth Amendment to enact Prohibition is passed by the United States Congress.
1932 – The Chicago Bears defeat the Portsmouth Spartans in the first NFL playoff game to win the NFL Championship.
1935 – The Lanka Sama Samaja Party is founded in Ceylon.
1939 – World War II: The Battle of the Heligoland Bight, the first major air battle of the war, takes place.
1944 – World War II: XX Bomber Command responds to the Japanese Operation Ichi-Go offensive by dropping five hundred tons of incendiary bombs on a supply base in Hankow, China.
1944 – The Supreme Court of the United States issued its decision in Korematsu v. United States supporting Franklin D. Roosevelt's Executive Order 9066 which cleared the way for the incarceration of nearly all 120,000 Japanese Americans, two-thirds of whom were U.S. citizens, born and raised in the United States.
1958 – Project SCORE, the world's first communications satellite, is launched.
1966 – Saturn's moon Epimetheus is discovered by astronomer Richard Walker.
1972 – Vietnam War: President Richard Nixon announces that the United States will engage North Vietnam in Operation Linebacker II, a series of Christmas bombings, after peace talks collapsed with North Vietnam on the 13th.
1973 – Soviet Soyuz Programme: Soyuz 13, crewed by cosmonauts Valentin Lebedev and Pyotr Klimuk, is launched from Baikonur in the Soviet Union.
1977 – United Airlines Flight 2860 crashes near Kaysville, Utah, killing all three crew members on board.
  1977   – SA de Transport Aérien Flight 730 crashes near Madeira Airport in Funchal, Madeira, Portugal, killing 36.
1981 – First flight of the Russian heavy strategic bomber Tu-160, the world's largest combat aircraft, largest supersonic aircraft and largest variable-sweep wing aircraft built.
1995 –  A Lockheed L-188 Electra crashes in Jamba, Cuando Cubango, Angola, killing 141 people.
1999 – NASA launches into orbit the Terra platform carrying five Earth Observation instruments, including ASTER, CERES, MISR, MODIS and MOPITT.
2002 – California gubernatorial recall: Then Governor of California Gray Davis announces that the state would face a record budget deficit of $35 billion, roughly double the figure reported during his reelection campaign one month earlier.
2005 – The Chadian Civil War begins when rebel groups, allegedly backed by neighbouring Sudan, launch an attack in Adré.
2006 – The first of a series of floods strikes Malaysia. The death toll of all flooding is at least 118, with over 400,000 people displaced.
  2006   – United Arab Emirates holds its first-ever elections.
2015 – Kellingley Colliery, the last deep coal mine in Great Britain, closes.
2017 – Amtrak Cascades passenger train 501, derailed near DuPont, Washington, a city in United States near Olympia, Washington killing six people, and injuring 70 others.
2018 – List of bolides: A meteor exploded over the Bering Sea with a force over 10 times greater than the atomic bomb that destroyed Hiroshima in 1945.
2019 – The United States House of Representatives impeaches Donald Trump for the first time.
2022 – Argentina win the 2022 FIFA World Cup final, defeating title holders France 4–2 on penalties following a 3–3 draw after extra time.

Births

Pre-1600

1406 – Richard Olivier de Longueil, French Roman Catholic bishop and cardinal (d. 1470)
1481 – Sophie of Mecklenburg, Duchess of Mecklenburg, Duchess of Saxony (d. 1503)
1499 – Sebald Heyden, German musicologist and theologian (d. 1561)
1505 – Philipp von Hutten, German explorer (d. 1546)
1507 – Ōuchi Yoshitaka, Japanese daimyō (d. 1551)
1552 – Ahmad Ibn al-Qadi, Moroccan writer, judge and mathematician (d. 1616)
1590 – William Louis, Count of Nassau-Saarbrücken (d. 1640)

1601–1900
1602 – Simonds d'Ewes, English historian and politician (d. 1650)
1610 – Charles du Fresne, sieur du Cange, French philologist and historian (d. 1688)
1620 – Heinrich Roth, German missionary and scholar (d. 1668)
1624 – John Hull, colonial American merchant and politician (d. 1683)
1626 – Christina, Queen of Sweden (d. 1689)
1660 – Countess Johanna Magdalene of Hanau-Lichtenberg (d. 1715)
1661 – Christopher Polhem, Swedish physicist and inventor (d. 1751)
1662 – James Douglas, 2nd Duke of Queensberry, Scottish colonel and politician, Secretary of State for Scotland (d. 1711)
1707 – Charles Wesley, English missionary and composer (d. 1788)
1725 – Johann Salomo Semler, German historian and theologian (d. 1791)
1734 – Jean-Baptiste Rey, French conductor and composer (d. 1810)
1800 – James Watney, English brewer and businessman (d. 1884)
1824 – John Hall, English-New Zealand politician, 12th Prime Minister of New Zealand (d. 1907)
1825 – Charles Griffin, American general (d. 1876)
  1825   – John S. Harris, American surveyor and politician (d. 1906)
1835 – Lyman Abbott, American minister, theologian, and author (d. 1922)
1847 – Augusta Holmès, French pianist and composer (d. 1903)
1849 – Henrietta Edwards, Canadian activist and author (d. 1931)
1856 – J. J. Thomson, English physicist and academic, Nobel Prize laureate (d. 1940)
1860 – Edward MacDowell, American pianist and composer (d. 1908)
1861 – Lionel Monckton, English composer and critic (d. 1924)
1863 – Archduke Franz Ferdinand of Austria (d. 1914)
1867 – Foxhall P. Keene, American polo player and horse breeder (d. 1941)
1869 – Edward Willis Redfield, American painter and educator (d. 1965)
1870 – Saki, British short story writer (d. 1916)
1873 – Francis Burton Harrison, American general and politician, 6th Governor-General of the Philippines (d. 1957)
1875 – Matt McGrath, Irish-American hammer thrower (d. 1941)
1878 – Joseph Stalin, Georgian-Russian marshal and politician, 4th Premier of the Soviet Union (d. 1953)
1879 – Paul Klee, Swiss-German painter and educator (d. 1940)
1882 – Richard Maury, American-Argentinian engineer, designed the Salta–Antofagasta railway (d. 1950)
1884 – Emil Starkenstein, Czech pharmacologist, co-founded clinical pharmacology (d. 1942)
1886 – Ty Cobb, American baseball player and manager (d. 1961)
1887 – Bhikhari Thakur, Indian actor, singer, and playwright (d. 1971)
1888 – Gladys Cooper, English actress and singer (d. 1971)
  1888   – Robert Moses, American urban planner (d. 1981)
1890 – Edwin Howard Armstrong, American engineer, invented FM radio (d. 1954)
1896 – Gerald Barry, English colonel and cricketer (d. 1977)
1897 – Fletcher Henderson, American pianist and composer (d. 1952)
1899 – Peter Wessel Zapffe, Norwegian philosopher and author (d. 1990)

1901–present
1904 – George Stevens, American director, producer, screenwriter, and cinematographer (d. 1975)
1907 – Bill Holland, American race car driver (d. 1984)
  1907   – Lawrence Lucie, American guitarist and educator (d. 2009)
1908 – Celia Johnson, English actress (d. 1982)
  1908   – Paul Siple, American geographer and explorer (d. 1969)
1910 – Abe Burrows, American author, playwright, and director (d. 1985)
  1910   – Eric Tindill, New Zealand rugby player, cricketer, and umpire (d. 2010)
1911 – Jules Dassin, American-Greek actor, director, producer, and screenwriter (d. 2008)
1912 – Benjamin O. Davis, Jr., American general and pilot (d. 2002)
1913 – Alfred Bester, American author and screenwriter (d. 1987)
  1913   – Willy Brandt, German politician, 4th Chancellor of Germany, Nobel Prize laureate (d. 1992)
  1913   – Ray Meyer, American basketball player and coach (d. 2006)
1916 – Douglas Fraser, Scottish-American trade union leader and academic (d. 2008)
  1916   – Betty Grable, American actress, singer, and dancer (d. 1973)
1917 – Ossie Davis, American actor and activist (d. 2005)
1920 – Robert Leckie, American soldier and author (d. 2001)
1922 – Jack Brooks, American colonel, lawyer, and politician (d. 2012)
  1922   – Esther Lederberg, American microbiologist (d. 2006)
1923 – Edwin Bramall, Baron Bramall, English field marshal and politician, Lord Lieutenant of Greater London (d. 2019)
1927 – Ramsey Clark, American lawyer and politician, 66th United States Attorney General (d. 2021)
  1927   – Roméo LeBlanc, Canadian journalist and politician, 25th Governor General of Canada (d. 2009)
1928 – Mirza Tahir Ahmad, Indian-English caliph and author (d. 2003)
  1928   – Harold Land, American tenor saxophonist (d. 2001)
1929 – Gino Cimoli, American baseball player (d. 2011)
  1929   – Józef Glemp, Polish cardinal (d. 2013)
1930 – Moose Skowron, American baseball player (d. 2012)
1931 – Allen Klein, American businessman and music publisher (d. 2009)
  1931   – Alison Plowden, English historian and author (d. 2007)
  1931   – Bill Thompson, American television host (d. 2014)
1932 – Norm Provan, Australian rugby league player, coach, and businessman (d. 2021)
  1932   – Roger Smith, American actor, producer, and screenwriter (d. 2017)
1933 – Lonnie Brooks, American blues singer and guitarist (d. 2017)
1934 – Marc Rich, Belgian-American businessman, founded Glencore (d. 2013)
  1934   – Boris Volynov, Russian colonel, engineer, and cosmonaut
1935 – Rosemary Leach, English actress (d. 2017)
  1935   – Jacques Pépin, French-American chef and author
1936 – Malcolm Kirk, English rugby player and wrestler (d. 1987)
1937 – Nancy Ryles, American politician (d. 1990)
1938 – Chas Chandler, English bass player and producer (d. 1996)
  1938   – Joel Hirschhorn, American songwriter and composer (d. 2005)
1939 – Michael Moorcock, English author and songwriter
  1939   – Harold E. Varmus, American biologist and academic, Nobel Prize laureate
  1939   – Pedro Jirón, Nicaraguan footballer
1940 – Ilario Castagner, Italian football manager
  1940   – John Cooper, English sprinter and hurdler (d. 1974)
1941 – Sam Andrew, American singer-songwriter and guitarist  (d. 2015)
  1941   – Wadada Leo Smith, American trumpet player and composer 
  1941   – Joan Wallach Scott, American historian, author, and academic
1942 – Lenore Blum, American mathematician and academic
  1942   – Bobby Keyes, Australian rugby league player (d. 2022)
1943 – Bobby Keys, American saxophone player (d. 2014)
  1943   – Keith Richards, English musician
  1943   – Alan Rudolph, American director and screenwriter
1944 – Crispian Steele-Perkins, English trumpet player and educator
1945 – Jean Pronovost, Canadian ice hockey player and coach
1946 – Steve Biko, South African activist, founded the Black Consciousness Movement (d. 1977)
  1946   – Steven Spielberg, American director, producer, and screenwriter, co-founded DreamWorks
1947 – Leonid Yuzefovich, Russian author and screenwriter
1948 – Bill Nelson, English singer-songwriter and guitarist 
  1948   – Mimmo Paladino, Italian sculptor and painter
  1948   – Laurent Voulzy, French-English singer-songwriter and guitarist
1949 – David A. Johnston, American volcanologist and geologist (d. 1980)
1950 – Gillian Armstrong, Australian director, producer, and screenwriter
  1950   – Randy Castillo, American drummer and songwriter (d. 2002)
  1950   – Sarath Fonseka, Sri Lankan general and politician
  1950   – Lizmark, Mexican wrestler (d. 2015)
  1950   – Leonard Maltin, American historian, author, and critic
1951 – Bobby Jones, American basketball player
1952 – John Leventhal, American songwriter and producer
1953 – Elliot Easton, American guitarist and singer
  1953   – Kevin Beattie, English footballer (d. 2018)
1954 – John Booth, English race car driver
  1954   – Ray Liotta, American actor (d. 2022)
  1954   – Willi Wülbeck, German runner
1955 – Vijay Mallya, Indian businessman and politician
  1955   – Bogusław Mamiński, Polish runner
1957 – Jonathan Cainer, English astrologer and author (d. 2016)
1958 – Geordie Walker, English guitarist 
  1958   – Julia Wolfe, American composer and educator
1960 – Kazuhide Uekusa, Japanese economist and academic
  1960   – Naoko Yamano, Japanese singer, guitarist and composer 
1961 – Brian Orser, Canadian figure skater and coach
  1961   – Leila Steinberg, American singer, producer, author, and poet
  1961   – Daniel S. Loeb, American businessman and philanthropist, founded Third Point Management
  1961   – Lalchand Rajput, former Indian cricketer
1963 – Greg D'Angelo, American drummer 
  1963   – Karl Dorrell, American football player and coach
  1963   – Pierre Nkurunziza, Burundian soldier and politician, President of Burundi (d. 2020)
  1963   – Charles Oakley, American basketball player and coach
  1963   – Brad Pitt, American actor and producer
1964 – Stone Cold Steve Austin, American wrestler and producer
  1964   – Don Beebe, American football player and coach
1965 – Shawn Christian, American actor, director, and screenwriter
  1965   – Manuel Peña Escontrela, Spanish footballer (d. 2012)
1966 – Gianluca Pagliuca, Italian footballer and sportscaster
1967 – Toine van Peperstraten, Dutch journalist
  1967   – Mille Petrozza, German singer-songwriter and guitarist
1968 – Mario Basler, German footballer and manager
  1968   – Rachel Griffiths, Australian actress
  1968   – Alejandro Sanz, Spanish singer-songwriter and guitarist
  1968   – Casper Van Dien, American actor and producer
1969 – Santiago Cañizares, Spanish footballer
  1969   – Justin Edinburgh, English footballer and manager (d. 2019)
  1969   – Akira Iida, Japanese race car driver
1970 – DMX, American rapper and actor (d. 2021)
  1970   – Lucious Harris, American basketball player
  1970   – Giannis Ploutarhos, Greek singer-songwriter
  1970   – Rob Van Dam, American wrestler
  1970   – Jonathan Yeo, English painter
  1970   – Norman Brown, American singer and guitarist 
1971 – Barkha Dutt, Indian journalist
  1971   – Noriko Matsueda, Japanese pianist and composer
  1971   – Arantxa Sánchez Vicario, Spanish tennis player and sportscaster
1972 – Anzhela Balakhonova, Ukrainian pole vaulter
  1972   – Raymond Herrera, American drummer and songwriter 
1973 – Fatuma Roba, Ethiopian runner
1974 – Peter Boulware, American football player and politician
  1974   – Knut Schreiner, Norwegian singer, guitarist, and producer 
1975 – Sia, Australian singer-songwriter 
  1975   – Randy Houser, American singer-songwriter and guitarist
  1975   – Trish Stratus, Canadian wrestler and actress
1977 – José Acevedo, Dominican baseball player
  1977   – Claudia Gesell, German runner
  1977   – Axwell, Swedish DJ, record producer, member of Swedish House Mafia
1978 – Daniel Cleary, Canadian ice hockey player 
  1978   – Ali Curtis, American soccer player
  1978   – Josh Dallas, American actor
  1978   – Katie Holmes, American actress
1980 – Christina Aguilera, American singer-songwriter, producer, and actress
  1980   – Neil Fingleton, English actor and basketball player, one of the tallest 25 men in the world (d. 2017)
  1980   – Benjamin Watson, American football player
1983 – Andy Fantuz, Canadian football player
1984 – Brian Boyle, American ice hockey player
  1984   – Paul Harrison, English footballer
  1984   – Giuliano Razzoli, Italian skier
  1984   – Derrick Tribbett, American bass player and singer 
1986 – François Hamelin, Canadian speed skater
  1986   – Usman Khawaja, Pakistani-Australian cricketer
1987 – Miki Ando, Japanese figure skater
1988 – Lizzie Deignan, English cyclist
  1988   – Seth Doege, American football player
  1988   – Brianne Theisen-Eaton, Canadian heptathlete
  1988   – Imad Wasim, Pakistani cricketer
1989 – Ashley Benson, American actress and singer
1990 – Sierra Kay, American singer-songwriter 
  1990   – Victor Hedman, Swedish ice hockey defenceman
1991 – Marcus Butler, English internet celebrity 
1992 – Bridgit Mendler, American singer, songwriter and actress
  1992   – Ryan Crouser, American shot putter
1993 – Byron Buxton, American baseball player
  1993   – Thomas Lam, Finnish professional football defender
1994 – Natália Kelly, American-Austrian singer
  1994   – Gerard Gumbau, Spanish professional footballer
1995 – Barbora Krejčíková, Czech tennis player
1997 – Ronald Acuña Jr., Venezuelan baseball player
2000 – Korapat Kirdpan, Thai actor and singer
  2000   – Travon Walker, American football player
2001 – Billie Eilish, American singer

Deaths

Pre-1600
 919 – Lady Wu, wife of Qian Liu (b. 858)
 933 – Yaonian Yanmujin, Chinese empress dowager
1075 – Edith of Wessex (b. 1025)
1133 – Hildebert, French poet and scholar (b. 1055)
1290 – Magnus III, king of Sweden (b. 1240)
1442 – Pierre Cauchon, French Catholic bishop (b. 1371)
1495 – Alfonso II of Naples (b. 1448)
1577 – Anna of Saxony, Princess consort of Orange (b. 1544)

1601–1900
1645 – Nur Jahan, empress consort of the Mughal Empire (b. 1577)
1651 – William Brabazon, 1st Earl of Meath, English lawyer and politician (b. 1580)
1692 – Veit Ludwig von Seckendorff, German scholar and politician (b. 1626)
1737 – Antonio Stradivari, Italian instrument maker (b. 1644)
1787 – Soame Jenyns, English poet and politician (b. 1704)
1799 – Jean-Étienne Montucla, French mathematician and historian (b. 1725)
1803 – Johann Gottfried Herder, German philosopher, theologian, and poet (b. 1744)
1829 – Jean-Baptiste Lamarck, French soldier, biologist, and academic (b. 1744)
1843 – Thomas Graham, 1st Baron Lynedoch, Scottish-English general and politician (b. 1748)
1848 – Bernard Bolzano, Bohemian priest and mathematician (b. 1781)
1864 – José Justo Corro, Mexican politician and president, (1836-1837) (b. 1794)
1869 – Louis Moreau Gottschalk, American pianist and composer (b. 1829)
1880 – Michel Chasles, French mathematician and academic (b. 1793)
1892 – Richard Owen, English biologist, anatomist, and paleontologist (b. 1804)

1901–present
1919 – John Alcock, English captain and pilot (b. 1892)
1922 – Sir Carl Meyer, 1st Baronet, German-English banker and businessman (b. 1851)
1925 – Hamo Thornycroft, English sculptor and academic (b. 1850)
1932 – Eduard Bernstein, German theorist and politician (b. 1850)
1936 – Andrija Mohorovičić, Croatian meteorologist and seismologist (b. 1857)
1939 – Ernest Lawson, Canadian-American painter (b. 1873)
1961 – Leo Reisman, American violinist and bandleader (b. 1897)
1969 – Charles Dvorak, American pole vaulter and coach (b. 1878)
1971 – Bobby Jones, American golfer and lawyer (b. 1902)
  1971   – Diana Lynn, American actress (b. 1926)
1973 – Allamah Rasheed Turabi, Indian-Pakistani religious leader and philosopher (b. 1908)
1974 – Harry Hooper, American baseball player, coach, and manager (b. 1887)
1975 – Theodosius Dobzhansky, Ukrainian geneticist and biologist (b. 1900)
1977 – Michio Nishizawa, Japanese baseball player and manager (b. 1921)
  1977   – Louis Untermeyer  American poet, anthologist, critic (b. 1885)
1980 – Dobriša Cesarić, Croatian poet and translator (b. 1902)
  1980   – Alexei Kosygin, Russian soldier and politician, 8th Premier of the Soviet Union (b. 1904)
1982 – Hans-Ulrich Rudel, German colonel and pilot (b. 1916)
1985 – Xuân Diệu, Vietnamese poet and author (b. 1916)
1987 – Conny Plank, German keyboard player and producer  (b. 1940)
1988 – Niyazi Berkes, Turkish Cypriot-English sociologist and academic (b. 1908)
1990 – Anne Revere, American actress (b. 1903)
  1990   – Paul Tortelier, French cellist and composer (b. 1914)
  1990   – Joseph Zubin, Lithuanian-American psychologist and academic (b. 1900)
1991 – George Abecassis, English race car driver (b. 1913)
1992 – Mark Goodson, American game show producer, created Family Feud and The Price Is Right (b. 1915)
1993 – Helm Glöckler, German race car driver (b. 1909)
  1993   – Sam Wanamaker, American-English actor, director, and producer (b. 1919)
1994 – Roger Apéry, Greek-French mathematician and academic (b. 1916)
  1994   – Lilia Skala, Austrian-American actress (b. 1896)
1995 – Brian Brockless, English organist, composer, and conductor (b. 1926)
  1995   – Ross Thomas, American author (b. 1926)
  1995   – Konrad Zuse, German engineer, designed the Z3 computer (b. 1910)
1996 – Yulii Borisovich Khariton, Russian physicist and academic (b. 1904)
  1996   – Irving Caesar, American composer (b. 1895)
1997 – Chris Farley, American comedian and actor (b. 1964)
1998 – Lev Dyomin, Russian colonel, pilot, and astronaut (b. 1926)
1999 – Robert Bresson, French director and screenwriter (b. 1901)
2000 – Stan Fox, American race car driver (b. 1952)
  2000   – Randolph Apperson Hearst, American businessman (b. 1915)
  2000   – Kirsty MacColl, British singer-songwriter (b. 1959)
2001 – Gilbert Bécaud, French singer-songwriter, pianist, and actor (b. 1927)
  2001   – Dimitris Dragatakis, Greek violinist and composer (b. 1914)
  2001   – Marcel Mule, French saxophonist and educator (b. 1901)
2002 – Necip Hablemitoğlu, Turkish historian and academic (b. 1954)
  2002   – Ray Hnatyshyn, Canadian lawyer and politician, 24th Governor General of Canada (b. 1934)
  2002   – Wayne Owens, American lawyer and politician (b. 1937)
  2002   – Lucy Grealy, Irish-American author (b. 1963)
2004 – Anthony Sampson, English journalist and author (b. 1926)
2005 – Alan Voorhees, American engineer and urban planner (b. 1922)
2006 – Joseph Barbera, American animator, director, and producer, co-founded Hanna-Barbera (b. 1911)
  2006   – Ruth Bernhard, German-American photographer (b. 1905)
  2006   – Shaukat Siddiqui, Pakistani author and activist (b. 1923)
2007 – Hans Billian, Polish-German actor, director, and screenwriter (b. 1918)
  2007   – Gerald Le Dain, Canadian lawyer and judge (b. 1924)
  2007   – William Strauss, American author and playwright (b. 1947)
  2007   – Alan Wagner, American businessman and critic (b. 1931)
2008 – Majel Barrett, American actress and producer (b. 1932)
  2008   – Mark Felt, American FBI agent and informant (b. 1913)
2010 – Phil Cavarretta, American baseball player and manager (b. 1916)
  2010   – Jacqueline de Romilly, French philologist, author, and scholar (b. 1913)
  2010   – Tommaso Padoa-Schioppa, Italian economist and politician, Italian Minister of Economy and Finances (b. 1940)
  2010   – James Pickles, English judge and journalist (b. 1925)
2011 – Václav Havel, Czech poet, playwright, and politician, 1st President of the Czech Republic (b. 1936)
2012 – Frank Macchiarola, American lawyer and academic (b. 1941)
  2012   – Mustafa Ould Salek, Mauritanian colonel and politician, President of Mauritania (b. 1936)
  2012   – Jim Whalen, American football player (b. 1943)
  2012   – Anatoliy Zayaev, Ukrainian footballer, coach, and manager (b. 1931)
2013 – Ken Hutcherson, American football player (b. 1952)
  2013   – Graham Mackay, South African-English businessman (b. 1949)
2014 – Donald J. Albosta, American soldier and politician (b. 1925)
  2014   – Gideon Ben-Yisrael, Israeli soldier and politician (b. 1923)
  2014   – Larry Henley, American singer-songwriter (b. 1937)
  2014   – Virna Lisi, Italian actress (b. 1936)
  2014   – Mandy Rice-Davies, English model and actress (b. 1944)
  2014   – Robert Simpson, American meteorologist and author (b. 1912)
2015 – Luc Brewaeys, Belgian pianist, composer, and conductor (b. 1959)
  2015   – Helge Solum Larsen, Norwegian businessman and politician (b. 1969)
2016 – Zsa Zsa Gabor, Hungarian-American actress and socialite (b. 1917)
2017 – Kim Jong-hyun, South Korean singer (b. 1990)
2020 – Jerry Relph, American politician and member of the Minnesota Senate (b. 1944)
2021 – Sayaka Kanda, Japanese actress and singer (b. 1986)

Holidays and observances
 Christian feast day:
 Expectation of the Blessed Virgin Mary
 Flannán
 Gatianus of Tours
 O Adonai
 Sebastian (Eastern Orthodox Church)
 Winibald
 December 18 (Eastern Orthodox liturgics)
 International Migrants Day
 National Day (Qatar)
 Republic Day (Niger)
 UN Arabic Language Day (United Nations)

References

External links

 BBC: On This Day
 
 Historical Events on December 18

Days of the year
December